Vinod Intelligent Cookware, is an Indian manufacturer of cookware.

It was Anil Agarwal, son of Rajeram Agarwal who collaborated with Saphymo Steel of France to introduce "Copper Sandwich Bottom Cookware", which is a multi-layered bottom and also a good conductor of heat. For this Mr. Agarwal had built a manufacturing unit "Kraftwares (I) Ltd" at Palghar, Mumbai and took a step by setting up a factory in Bhandup, Mumbai, which was manufacturing stainless steel products for the local market. These products are now in the national market as "Vinod Bowl" or "Vinod Entry Dish".

As a modestly-priced product, Vinod cookware is accessible by many Indian households. The range of cookware supports cooking a broad spectrum of Indian cuisine.

History

Timeline 

 2015 - Mandira Bedi becomes brand ambassador
 2014 - Vinod Group became the largest exporter of stainless
 2013 - Sakshi Tanwar as its Brand Ambassador
 2006 - Set up another factory in Palghar
 2000 - manufacturing base was set up in Palghar
 1992 - Vinod Cookware went global as Kraftwares began to export
 1990 - Vinod launched Aluminum Sandwich Bottom Cookware
 1987 - Collaborated with Saphymo Steel
 1977 - Factory opened in Bhandup
 1962 - Company founded as a cookware trading company

Products 

Product Category:

 Pressure cooker
 Pressure PAN
 Zest non-stick
 Hard anodised
 TRIPly
 Stainless steel
 Kraft appliances

References

External links
Vinod Introduces "Vito Health"
Vinod Cookware Introduces Multi Kadai
Vinod Cookware Introduces Zest Superb+	
Vinod Cookware – a debt free Rs300 crore company

Manufacturing companies established in 1962
Kitchenware brands
Companies based in Mumbai
1962 establishments in Maharashtra